Aksana Drahun (born May 19, 1981), a.k.a. Oksana Dragun, is a Belarusian sprinter, who specializes in the 100 metres. Her personal best time is 11.28 seconds, achieved in July 2005 in Minsk.

Drahun won a bronze medal in 4 x 100 metres relay at the 2005 World Championships in Athletics together with Yulia Nestsiarenka, Natallia Solohub and Alena Neumiarzhitskaya. At the 2006 European Athletics Championships in Gothenburg she won a bronze medal in 4 × 100 m relay with Nestsiarenka, Natallia Safronnikava and Neumiarzhitskaya.

Drahun represented Belarus at the 2008 Summer Olympics in Beijing. She competed at the 4 × 100 m relay together with Nestsiarenka, Nastassia Shuliak and Anna Bagdanovich. In their first round heat they placed sixth with a time of 43.69 seconds, which was the 9th time overall out of sixteen participating nations. With this result they failed to qualify for the final.

References

External links

Belarusian female sprinters
1981 births
Living people
Athletes (track and field) at the 2008 Summer Olympics
Olympic athletes of Belarus
World Athletics Championships medalists
European Athletics Championships medalists
Olympic female sprinters